Stanley Blumenfeld Jr. (born March 7, 1962) is a United States district judge of the United States District Court for the Central District of California. He formerly served as a judge on the Los Angeles County Superior Court from 2006 to 2020.

Education 

Blumenfeld received his Bachelor of Arts from Binghamton University, a Master of Arts in Spanish from New York University in 1985, and his Juris Doctor from the University of California, Los Angeles in 1988, where he served as editor-in-chief of the UCLA Law Review and was inducted into the Order of the Coif.

Career 

Blumenfeld served as a law clerk to Judge Cynthia Holcomb Hall of the United States Court of Appeals for the Ninth Circuit from 1988 to 1989. He was an Assistant United States Attorney for the Central District of California from 1989 to 1993, and a Special Assistant United States Attorney from 1993 to 1996. He practiced at O'Melveny & Myers from 1993 to 2006, where he served as co-chair of the healthcare and environmental law practice groups. He is an adjunct professor at the University of Southern California School of Law, where he teaches a course in Constitutional criminal procedure and criminal remedies. From 2011 to 2014, he was an adjunct professor at Southwestern Law School.

State judicial career 

Blumenfeld was appointed to the Los Angeles County Superior Court by Governor Arnold Schwarzenegger on June 20, 2006, to succeed John Sandoz. He was re-elected in 2014 for a term that expires in January 2021. In 2020, he was re-elected unopposed. His tenure on the state court ended when he became a federal judge.

Federal judicial service 

On October 10, 2018, President Donald Trump announced his intent to nominate Blumenfeld to serve as a United States district judge of the United States District Court for the Central District of California. On November 13, 2018, his nomination was sent to the U.S. Senate. President Trump nominated Blumenfeld to the seat vacated by Judge Audrey B. Collins, who retired on August 1, 2014.

On January 3, 2019, his nomination was returned to the President under Rule XXXI, Paragraph 6 of the United States Senate. On January 30, 2019, President Trump announced his intent to renominate Blumenfeld to the district court. On February 6, 2019, his nomination was sent to the Senate. A hearing on his nomination before the Senate Judiciary Committee was held on November 13, 2019. On January 3, 2020, his nomination was once again returned to the President under Rule XXXI, Paragraph 6 of the United States Senate. On January 9, 2020, he was renominated to the same seat. On March 5, 2020, his nomination was reported out of committee by a voice vote. On September 15, 2020, the Senate invoked cloture on his nomination by a 89–6 vote. His nomination was confirmed later that day by a 92–4 vote. He received his judicial commission on September 18, 2020.

References

External links 
 
 

|-

1962 births
Living people
20th-century American lawyers
21st-century American lawyers
21st-century American judges
Assistant United States Attorneys
Binghamton University alumni
California lawyers
California state court judges
Judges of the United States District Court for the Central District of California
New York University alumni
People from Patchogue, New York
Southwestern Law School
Superior court judges in the United States
UCLA School of Law alumni
United States district court judges appointed by Donald Trump
USC Gould School of Law faculty